Dani Kind is a Canadian actress.

Early life
Danielle Kind was born on 10 January 1980. Raised in Toronto, Ontario, Kind chose her career in grade nine after seeing an actress perform a monologue during her high school studies. Kind then joined a high school improvisational theatre group, and in college, took theatre arts.

Career
Kind is most noted for her role as Anne Carlson in the television series Workin' Moms, for which she received a Canadian Screen Award nomination for Best Actress in a Comedy Series at the 7th Canadian Screen Awards in 2019. Kind is repped by Patterson Talent Management.

Kind also has a recurring role as Mercedes Gardner in Wynonna Earp.

Kind often acts for the Hallmark Channel.

Capsule, a short film with Kind as the director, was funded by an Indiegogo campaign and closed at 109%.

Personal life
Kind is a mother to two sons.

Filmography

Stage
 2015 Toronto, Ontario production of Jez Butterworth's The River (2012)

Film

Television

References

External links

Canadian television actresses
Canadian film actresses
Living people
1980 births